International Military Antiques, Inc is an American seller of military collectibles and memorabilia, based in Gillette, New Jersey. It was founded in 1981 by Christian Cranmer.  His son Alex joined him in 2004.

The National Geographic Channel has created a television series about the company titled Family Guns.

Some of the world's prominent museums contain items from IMA, including the National World War II Museum, Natural History Museum of Los Angeles County, and West Point Museum.

They have also supplied the films Saving Private Ryan and the television series Band of Brothers with some of their movie props.

Gurkha collection
In 2004 Christian Cranmer completed his 35-year-long attempt to convince the Nepal government to sell him over 50,000 antique firearms.  These weapons were part of the arsenal of the Royal Nepalese Gurkha Army, and had been sealed away in the Lagan Silekhana Palace since 1839. He has published a book and made a DVD documentary about this, titled Treasure is Where You Find It.

References

External links
Official website

Militaria
American antiques experts
Companies established in 1981
Companies based in Morris County, New Jersey